The Ministry of Livestock, Fisheries and Rural Development is a ministry in the Burmese government responsible for the country's livestock and fishery sectors.

The development of livestock and fisheries sectors of the Republic of the Union of Myanmar was undertaken by the Ministry of Agriculture and Forestry up to the fiscal year of 1982-1983. In accordance with the decision of 3/6 cabinet meeting of State Council held on 10 February 1983, the Ministry of the Livestock and Fisheries was particularly organised on 15 March 1983. With Order No. (67/2013) dated 9 August 2013 of President Office, Republic of the Union of Myanmar and in accord with the agreement of the Seventh Regular Session of First Pyidaungsu Hluttaw, Ministry of Livestock and Fisheries has been renamed Ministry of Livestock, Fisheries and Rural Development.

Departmental bodies 
 Directorate of Livestock, Fisheries and Rural Development
 Livestock Breeding and Veterinary Department
 Department of Fisheries
 Department of Rural Development
 University of Veterinary Science, Yezin

Objectives 
 To sufficient the domestic consumption and export the extra enough.
 To control the infectious disease and zoonosis disease by co-operation with international organisation, UN agencies and concern department
 To produce the Quality and safety Livestock Products
 To achieve the average livestock improvement rate 8.43% per year
 To invite foreign investment in line with state policy
 To increase per capita consumption of fish
 To meet with ASEAN Economic Community Blue Print in fishery priority integration sector.

Policies 
 Expansion of livestock business enterprise mainly based on dairy and beef cattle
 Extension of the disease free zone for the purpose of livestock development
 Enlargement of the breeding of horse, donkey and mule for the use of transportation needed for vaccination campaigns, research projects and some remote areas where other means of transport are merely possible
 Production of internationally marketable inland and marine fish and shrimp species concordant with respective regions and climate in accordance with good breeding methods
 Increase production of value added fishery products in line with international standards
 Conservation of fisheries resources for sustainable fisheries in accordance with international guidelines
 To produce the livestock and fisheries products for food security by capture and culture system without compromising the ecosystem and to conduct the production of quality and safety livestock and fisheries products in line with international standard.
 To improve 3 times of the gross domestic product from the based year in livestock and fisheries sector.

References

Livestock
Myanmar
Rural development in Asia
Myanmar